Brüggemann is a surname. Notable people with the surname include:

 Anna Brüggemann (born 1981), German actress and screenwriter
 Connor Bruggemann, American penny stock trader
 Friedrich Brüggemann (1850–1878), German zoologist
 Hans Brüggemann (ca. 1480–after 1521), German artist
 Heini Brüggemann (early 20th c.), German sprint canoeist
 Lisa Brüggemann (born 1984), German artistic gymnast
 Magda Bruggemann (mid 20th c.),  Mexican Olympic swimmer
 Michael Brüggemann (1583–1654), German Lutheran pastor
 Theodor Brüggemann (1796–1866), Prussian school teacher, government official and politician